Pierre de l'Estache (c.1688, Paris - 28 November 1774, Rome) was a French sculptor.

He produced a copy of the Kallipygian Venus in Rome in 1722-23, for Augustus the Strong's Grosser Garten in Dresden (this copy was destroyed with the gardens in 1945).  He was president of the French Academy in Rome in 1737-1738.  His son Charles de L’Estache was also a sculptor (?-14 March 1811)

References

Bibliography 
  Anne-Lise Desmas, ''Pierre de L'Estache (1688 ca. - 1774) : un sculpteur français à Rome entre institutions nationales et grands chantiers pontificaux, in Studiolo, 1, 2002 (includes a catalogue of his work, biography, reception and bibliography)

1680s births
1774 deaths
Artists from Paris
18th-century French sculptors
French male sculptors
18th-century French male artists